Sošice is a settlement in the municipality of Žumberak, Zagreb County, Croatia. According to the 2011 census, it has 77 inhabitants.

The name of the settlement was mentioned in written documents for the first time in Bernard's gift book, when the monastery in Kostanjevica na Krki acquired part of the land in Sošice in 1249. 

The town was an important settlement of the Greek Catholic Church in Croatia. The local parish was formed  1746. The parish home was burnt down along with the local school in 1942 by Yugoslav Partisans.

Jazovka, a pit which contained a mass grave from World War II, is located near the settlement.

References 

Populated places in Zagreb County